Zero to Hero may refer to:
 Hercules: Zero to Hero, 1999 American animated film
 "Zero to Hero", a song in Hercules, the soundtrack to the 1997 film, Hercules
 Zero to Hero (TV series), 2005 Singaporean TV series
 Zero to Hero (film), 2021 Hong Kong drama film